Byron A. Buffington (November 27, 1852 – October 1, 1929) was an American businessman and politician.

Biography 
Born in Juneau, Wisconsin, Buffington was educated in the public schools in Eau Claire, Wisconsin and Faribault Military School in Faribault, Minnesota. Buffington was in the grocery, merchandise, and lumber businesses. He was also president of the Chippewa Valley Bank. Buffington served in the Wisconsin State Assembly in 1897 and 1899 as a Republican.

Buffington died in Eau Claire, Wisconsin from complications caused by appendicitis.

Notes

External links

1852 births
1929 deaths
People from Juneau, Wisconsin
Politicians from Eau Claire, Wisconsin
Businesspeople from Wisconsin
Republican Party members of the Wisconsin State Assembly
Burials in Wisconsin